Annemarie Worst (born 19 December 1995) is a Dutch cyclist, who currently competes in cyclo-cross for UCI Cyclo-cross Team , and in road cycling for UCI Women's Continental Team . She became world under-23 cyclo-cross champion in 2017.

She won the European Championship and the Superprestige Gieten in 2018. During the 2019–20 season, she won the World Cup races in Bern, Tábor and Nommay, and won the overall classification.

Major results

Cyclo-cross

2016–17
 1st  UCI World Under-23 Championships
 3rd National Under-23 Championships
 UCI World Cup
3rd Hoogerheide
2017–18
 EKZ CrossTour
1st Baden
 DVV Trophy
2nd Baal
3rd Lille
 Brico Cross
2nd Maldegem
 Superprestige
3rd Boom
 3rd National Championships
 3rd Oostmalle
2018–19
 1st  UEC European Championships
 Superprestige
1st Gieten
2nd Ruddervoorde
2nd Diegem
2nd Hoogstraten
 DVV Trophy
1st Hamme
3rd Koppenberg
 UCI World Cup
2nd Bern
2nd Tábor
3rd Namur
3rd Koksijde
 Brico Cross
2nd Hulst
3rd Ronse
3rd Maldegem
 2nd Gullegem
 2nd Oostmalle
 3rd Wachtebeke
 3rd Leuven
2019–20
 1st  Overall UCI World Cup
1st Bern
1st Tábor
1st Nommay
2nd Hoogerheide
3rd Namur
3rd Heusden-Zolder
 2nd Overall DVV Trophy
1st Hamme
2nd Koppenberg
2nd Ronse
2nd Lille
2nd Brussels
3rd Kortrijk
3rd Loenhout
3rd Baal
 3rd Overall Superprestige
1st Zonhoven
1st Diegem
3rd Middelkerke
 Ethias Cross
1st Kruibeke
1st Beringen
1st Maldegem
2nd Meulebeke
2nd Hulst
 1st Overijse
 1st Oostmalle
 Rectavit Series
2nd Leuven
 2nd  UCI World Championships
 2nd National Championships
 3rd  UEC European Championships
2020–2021
 X²O Badkamers Trophy
1st Koppenberg
3rd Antwerpen
 2nd  UCI World Championships
 2nd  UEC European Championships
 Superprestige
2nd Gieten
2nd Ruddervoorde
3rd Heusden-Zolder
 Ethias Cross
2nd Sint-Niklaas
2021–2022
 UCI World Cup
1st Koksijde
3rd Tábor
3rd Hulst
 Ethias Cross
1st Maldegem
 1st Oostmalle
 3rd Overall Superprestige
2nd Ruddervoorde
2nd Niel
2nd Merksplas
2nd Gavere
3rd Gieten
3rd Heusden-Zolder
 3rd Overall X²O Badkamers Trophy
2nd Lille
3rd Herentals
2022–2023
 USCX Series
1st Rochester I
1st Rochester II
1st Baltimore I
1st Baltimore II
 Exact Cross
1st Sint-Niklaas
2nd Kruibeke
3rd Mol
 1st Maldegem
 1st Oostmalle
 UCI World Cup
2nd Besançon
3rd Fayetteville
3rd Tábor
 X²O Badkamers Trophy
3rd Herentals
3rd Lille
3rd Brussels
 Superprestige
3rd Middelkerke

Road
2022
 6th Overall Belgium Tour
1st Stage 2

References

External links
 
 
 

1995 births
Living people
Cyclo-cross cyclists
Dutch female cyclists
People from Harderwijk
Cyclists from Gelderland
21st-century Dutch women